PRL Advanced Radial-velocity Abu-sky Search, abbreviated PARAS, is a ground-based extrasolar planet search device.  Based at 1.2m telescope is located at Mt. Abu, India.The project is funded by Physical Research Laboratory, India.  The spectrograph works at a resolution of 67000.  With the help of simultaneous calibration technique, PARAS has achieved an RV accuracy of 1.3 m/s for the bright sun like quiet stars. Thorium-Argon lamp is used for calibration. New calibration techniques are also being explored by the project team. PARAS can detect planet in the habitable zone around M-type stars.

References

 
 ISRO’s PRL scientists discover an ‘EPIC’ planet

Exoplanet search projects
Spectrographs